Sasa Ognenovski (born 3 April 1979) is an Australian soccer player who played as a central defender, who represented the Australia national team on 22 occasions, and who last played for Sydney FC in the A-League. He is currently the assistant coach of the NPL Victoria 2 team Preston Lions.

In 2010, he was named Asian Footballer of the Year, won a position in the K-League Best XI, and won the AFC Champions League with Seongnam. These achievements led to his inclusion in the Australian squad for the 2011 AFC Asian Cup. Alongside Robert Cornthwaite and Eli Babalj, Ognenovski, at 1.95 m, is the joint third tallest player to have represented the Australia national soccer team, behind Zeljko Kalac (2.02 m) and Harry Souttar (1.98 m).

Club career
He previously played with Preston Lions in the 1997–2000 and 2003–2004 seasons, then with Melbourne Knights in the 2000–2001 and 2001–2002 seasons, and in the 2002–2003 season with Greek side Panahaiki, and then with Queensland Roar until transferring to Adelaide United FC in February 2008 to play in the Asian Champions League, starting in March 2008.

Ognenovski played his 50th A-League match against Sydney FC on 22 November 2008 scoring the opening goal, his first for Adelaide, in the 2–0 win at Hindmarsh Stadium. He followed this up a week later scoring a dramatic equaliser in Adelaide's 1–1 draw with Newcastle Jets heading in from another set piece.

In January 2009 it was revealed that Ognenovski was a target for K-League club Seongnam Ilhwa Chunma but the initial bid of A$285,000 was rejected with Adelaide asking for a transfer fee of $570,000. He was also a transfer target of another K-League side, FC Seoul, who sent officials to negotiate the fee with Adelaide.

The transfer saga was resolved on Tuesday 13 January 2009 when Adelaide United revealed Ognenovski would join Seongnam at the end of the A-League 2008-09 season on a two-year deal. The defender gave a glowing tribute to the club upon the announcement saying, "I’ve met some great people, the owners Nick and Dario are probably the best people I’ve met in football so it is a tough decision but obviously I have to secure my future and look after my family so that was the main reason that I took up the offer".

Ognenovski was voted the second best Macedonian footballer of 2008, behind Inter Milan's Goran Pandev. In 2010, in his second season with Seongnam Ilhwa Chunma, Ognenovski captained the team to victory in the AFC Champions League. He scored the opening goal of the match as Seongnam defeated Zob Ahan 3–1 in the final. Ognenovski was named the Man of the Match and the tournament's Most Valuable Player.

On 7 July 2012, Ognenovski moved to Umm-Salal Sports Club in the Qatar Stars League after an outstanding three-year spell at Seongnam. Ognenovski made his debut for Umm-Salal Sports Club on 21 October 2012 in the 1–1 away draw to Al Kharitiyath.

On 4 February 2014, Ognenovski moved back to the A-League to sign with Sydney FC. He scored his first goal against Newcastle Jets assisted by Italian marquee Alessandro Del Piero.

On 8 October 2014, Ogenovski, along with Nikola Petković were appointed Sydney FC's vice-captains for 2014. His first goal for the 2014–15 A-league season came in Rd 2 against Western Sydney Wanderers won by Sydney 3–2. Ogenovski appeared to score a goal, but it was ruled an own goal by Romeo Castelen. However, Ogenovski was suspended following the match for striking Vítor Saba in the head.

Ognenovski was released by Sydney on 3 June 2015.

International career
Ognenovski was eligible to represent Australia, but after not being selected in A-League based Australian squads for Asian Cup Qualifiers against Indonesia and Kuwait, Ognenovski expressed his disappointment and put himself up for selection for the country of his heritage, Macedonia. Although not available to play for Macedonia (due to not having yet received FIFA clearance) he was called by Srečko Katanec to play for the Republic of Macedonia national football team in the match against Moldova on 11 February 2009, although he did not feature due to issues with his eligibility.

After dashing his hopes for playing for Australia under former coach Pim Verbeek, new Socceroos manager Holger Osieck called him up for a friendly against Egypt in Cairo, Egypt, and he was subsequently named in the 23-man 2011 AFC Asian Cup squad.
Throughout the AFC Asian cup, he started every match and developed a solid defensive partnership with Lucas Neill, and scored the second goal in Australia's 6–0 defeat of Uzbekistan in the semi-finals.

Managers career
He is first coaching of the NPL Victoria team Dandenong City.

Honours

Seongnam Ilhwa Chunma
AFC Champions League: 2010
Korean FA Cup: 2011

International
AFC Asian Cup runner-up: 2011

Individual
AFC Asian Footballer of the Year: 2010 
AFC Champions League Most Valuable Player: 2010
K-League Best XI: 2010

Career statistics

Club statistics

1 – includes A-League final series statistics; K-League playoff statistics
2 – includes League Cup statistics
3 – includes FIFA Club World Cup statistics; AFC Champions League statistics are included in season commencing after group stages (i.e. 2008 ACL in 2008–09 A-League season etc.)

International statistics

References

External links 
 Adelaide United profile
 Oz Football profile
 Profile at MacedonianFootball.com
 
 soccerway.com
 
 worldfootball.net

1979 births
Australian people of Macedonian descent
Australia international soccer players
A-League Men players
National Soccer League (Australia) players
K League 1 players
Qatar Stars League players
Adelaide United FC players
Sydney FC players
Melbourne Knights FC players
Panachaiki F.C. players
Brisbane Roar FC players
Seongnam FC players
Umm Salal SC players
2011 AFC Asian Cup players
Preston Lions FC players
Asian Footballer of the Year winners
Australian expatriate sportspeople in Greece
Australian expatriate sportspeople in South Korea
Expatriate footballers in Qatar
Australian expatriate soccer players
Expatriate footballers in South Korea
Soccer players from Melbourne
Living people
Association football defenders
Australian soccer players
Australian soccer coaches
Australian Macedonian soccer managers
Australian expatriate sportspeople in Qatar
Expatriate footballers in Greece